Uffmoor Wood is a semi-natural woodland in Worcestershire, in the 
English Midlands. It is one of over a thousand woods cared for by the Woodland Trust. Sitting at the foot of the Clent Hills and about 3 km southwest of Halesowen, Uffmoor Wood is a popular recreational destination for local people. Adjacent to Hagley Woods, with its mystery of 'Who put Bella in the Wych Elm?', and the site of several pre-war murders, Uffmoor has developed a reputation for the supernatural.

In May 2017 the Trust temporarily suspended public access to the wood because of misbehaviour including dirt bike scrambling, drug peddling and public sexual acts.

External links
Woodland Trust: Welcome to Uffmoor Wood - Halesowen

References

Forests and woodlands of Worcestershire
Woodland Trust